Ibrahim Abdel Khalek (born 20 April 1986) is an Egyptian football right midfielder who plays for Egyptian Premier League side El Entag El Harby SC as well as the Egyptian national team.

Club career

Zamalek
Abdel Khalek made his debut for Zamalek on 15 August 2015 and scored in the 3–1 away win against Haras El-Hodood in the Round of 16 of the 2015 Egypt Cup.

International career
He made his international debut for Egypt in March 2013 against Qatar. He was called up again for the national team in March 2014 for a friendly game against Bosnia.

Honors
Zamalek SC
Egypt Cup : 2014-15

References

External links
Ibrahim Abdel Khalek at Footballdatabase

Egyptian footballers
Egypt international footballers
Association football midfielders
1986 births
Living people
Smouha SC players
Zamalek SC players
Wadi Degla SC players
El Entag El Harby SC players
El Raja SC players
Al Mokawloon Al Arab SC players
Ismaily SC players
Sportspeople from Alexandria
Egyptian Premier League players